Flat Creek is a  long 2nd order tributary to the Little River in Hoke County, North Carolina.

Course
Flat Creek rises on the Juniper Creek divide about 0.25 miles south-southeast of Johnson Mountain in Hoke County, North Carolina.  Flat Creek then flows northeasterly to meet the Little River about 1 mile south of Mt. Pleasant.

Watershed
Flat Creek drains  of area, receives about 47.8 in/year of precipitation, has a topographic wetness index of 452.17 and is about 50% forested.

References

Rivers of North Carolina
Rivers of Hoke County, North Carolina